The 2008 Big 12 Conference women's soccer tournament was the postseason women's soccer tournament for the Big 12 Conference held from November 5 to 9, 2008. The 7-match tournament was held at the Blossom Athletic Center in San Antonio, TX with a combined attendance of 5,216. The 8-team single-elimination tournament consisted of three rounds based on seeding from regular season conference play. The Missouri Tigers defeated the Colorado Buffaloes in the championship match to win their 1st conference tournament.

Regular season standings
Source:

Bracket

Awards

Most valuable player
Source:
Offensive MVP – Alysha Bonnick – Missouri
Defensive MVP – Tasha Dittamore – Missouri

All-Tournament team

References

 
Big 12 Conference Women's Soccer Tournament